Barossa German ( or ) is a dialect of German, predominantly spoken in the Barossa Valley region of South Australia. The prominent South Australian writer, Colin Thiele (1920–2006), whose grandparents were German immigrants, referred to "Barossa-Deutsch" as: "that quaintly inbred and hybrid language evolved from a century of linguistic isolation". It takes its name from the Barossa Valley, where many German people settled during the 19th century. Some words from Barossa German have entered South Australian English.

History

The first wave of German settlement in Australia began in 1838. German was first spoken in the Barossa Valley in the 1840s, when German Lutheran settlers from Prussia arrived in the area.

Use of the German language in Australia declined as a result of World War I. Many Germans were interned, and immigration by German people was officially banned between 1914 and 1925. In addition, the German language was actively suppressed by the Australian government during the war. For example, many placenames with German origins were changed. Lutheran schools were closed and were re-opened as state schools teaching in English.

There is some evidence that Barossa German was the first language of some people in South Australia until the late 20th century. For example, Colin Thiele claimed to have spoken nothing but German until he went to school.

Classification
Because most German immigrants to the Barossa were from Prussia and Silesia, Barossa German is classifiable as a Central German dialect. It is therefore relatively close to Standard German, when compared to analogous dialects spoken by German diaspora communities around the world.

According to linguist Peter Mickan, Barossa German has incorporated some elements of South Australian English, including some English vocabulary and grammatical forms.

Vocabulary and culture
The best-known examples of Barossa German vocabulary are words which have been adopted by South Australian English. One such local word with German origins is "butcher", the name given to a 200 ml (7 fl.oz.) beer glass, which is believed to be derived from the German Becher, meaning a cup or mug.

The Barossa is also home to kegel, a variety of nine-pin bowling, which takes place on indoor lanes (Kegelbahn), and is based on traditional German games similar to alley skittles. The Barossa town of Tanunda still features the Tanunda Kegel Club, founded in 1858.

See also

German settlement in Australia
German Australian

Notes and references

Notes

References
Peter Paul, 1965, Das Barossa Deutsche (MA thesis, University of Adelaide)
Dorothy Jauncey, 2004, South Australian Words: From Bardi-Grubs to Frog Cakes, Oxford University Press.

External links
Dave Nutting, 2001–2007, German Australia "German-speakers in Australia from 1788 to the Present" 
 Deutsche Version 
ABC Radio National, "South Australian Words" (Lingua Franca, 28 February 2004).

High German languages
German dialects
Culture of South Australia
Languages of Australia
German-Australian culture